Tomas "Tommy" Pettersson (born 29 December 1952) is a Swedish former motorcycle speedway rider.

Born in Norrköping, Pettersson learnt to ride a speedway bike in England, at Olle Nygren's training school in Boston. He made his competitive debut in 1971 for his home town team Vargarna, and won the Swedish Junior Championship the following year. He rode for Sweden in test matches against the Soviet Union in 1973 and England in 1974, and was due to tour England with Sweden in 1975 but a broken leg from a racing crash ruled him out. In 1976 he signed for Birmingham Brummies but a dispute between Birmingham and Vargarna meant that he only appeared in three challenge matches for Birmingham. He returned to Britain in 1977, first with Bristol Bulldogs and then a longer spell with Leicester Lions.

References

1952 births
Living people
Swedish speedway riders
Bristol Bulldogs riders
Leicester Lions riders
Sportspeople from Norrköping